The Weekender 24 is an American trailerable sailboat that was designed by Sparkman & Stephens as a cruiser and first built in 1965. It was Sparkman & Stephens design number 1701-C1.

The design is a development of Sparkman & Stephens design number 1701, the Rainbow 24, with a full cabin replacing the Rainbow 24's cuddy cabin for cruising, rather than daysailing.

Production
The design was built by Tidewater Boats, near Annapolis, Maryland, United States. The company completed 60 boats between 1965 and 1977, when the company went out of business and production ended.

Design
The Weekender 24 is a recreational keelboat, built predominantly of fiberglass, with wood trim. It has a masthead sloop rig; a spooned, raked stem; a raised counter, angled transom with a lazarette; an internally mounted spade-type rudder controlled by a tiller; a self-bailing cockpit and a fixed fin keel. It displaces  and carries  of cast iron ballast.

The boat is normally fitted with a small  outboard motor for docking and maneuvering.

The design has sleeping accommodation for four people, with a double "V"-berth in the bow cabin and two straight settees in the main cabin. The galley is located on both sides just aft of the bow cabin. The galley is equipped with an icebox on the port side and a sink on the starboard side. The head is located under the bow cabin berths.

For sailing the design may be equipped with either a jib or a genoa foresail.

Operational history
In a 2010 review Steve Henkel wrote, "with its relatively short mast (only 27 feet above the water), close to 50 percent ballast to displacement ratio, and a cast iron keel with its weight concentrated in a bulb at the bottom, the boat is about as stiff as she can be. If you carry too much sail in strong winds, and the boat heels excessively, she will develop a strong weather helm and simply round up into the wind—whether you like it or not. (New sailors might like this feature; others might not.) Worst features: With her relatively small sail area, she is not fast compared to, say, a J/24 or other modern boat, but if well-sailed might keep up with some of her contemporaries, such as an Ensign or Electra."

See also
List of sailing boat types

References

Keelboats
1960s sailboat type designs
Sailing yachts
Trailer sailers
Sailboat type designs by Sparkman and Stephens
Sailboat types built by Tidewater Boats